The Columbus mayoral election of 1899 was the 52nd mayoral election in Columbus, Ohio.  It was held on Monday, April 3, 1899. Democratic party incumbent mayor Samuel L. Black was defeated by Republican party nominee Samuel J. Swartz.

References

Bibliography

Mayoral elections in Columbus, Ohio
1899 Ohio elections
Columbus